A surveyor general is an official responsible for government surveying in a specific country or territory. Historically, this would often have been a military appointment, but it is now more likely to be a civilian post.

The following surveyor general positions exist, or have existed historically:

Surveyors general in Australia:
 Surveyor General of New South Wales
 Surveyor General of South Australia
 Surveyor General of Queensland
 Surveyor General of Tasmania
 Surveyor General of the Northern Territory
 Surveyor General of Victoria
 Surveyor General of Western Australia
Surveyors general in Canada:
 Arpenteur général du Québec - prior to 1840s as Surveyor General of Lower Canada
 Surveyor General of Ontario - 1791 to 1829 as Surveyor General of Upper Canada and the Commissioner of Crown Lands (Province of Canada) 1827 to 1867
 Surveyor General of Nova Scotia
Surveyors-general in British North America
 Surveyor General of the Colony of Vancouver Island
 Joseph Despard Pemberton
 Surveyor General of New Brunswick
 Robert Power (surveyor)
 Surveyor General of Cornwall, UK
 Surveyor General of Hong Kong
 Surveyor General of India
 Surveyor General of Ireland
 Surveyor General of Malaysia
 Surveyor General of New Netherland
 Surveyor-General of New Zealand
 The Surveyor General of Pakistan
 Surveyor General of Sri Lanka (formerly Surveyor General of Ceylon)
Surveyors general in the United States and its colonial predecessors: 
 Surveyor General of the United States
 Surveyor General of Arizona
 Surveyor General of North Carolina
Surveyor General of the Province of North Carolina 
 Surveyor General of the Northwest Territory (today's north-central U.S.)
 Surveyor General of the Eastern District
 Surveyor General of Spanish Louisiana

References

See also
 Surveyor Generals Corner (Australia)
 Public Land Survey System (United States)

Surveyors
Government research